The Hazard Bombers were a minor league baseball team that played in the Mountain States League between 1948 and 1952.

History

The team began in 1948 in Oak Ridge, Tennessee, as the Oak Ridge Bombers but quickly moved to Hazard, Kentucky, and took on the Hazard name. They were affiliates of the Brooklyn Dodgers (1950–1952). The 1951 Bombers were recognized as one of the 100 greatest minor league teams of all time.

The ballpark

The Bombers played at Bomber Field. The Bobby Davis Museum and Park located at 234 Walnut Street
Hazard, Kentucky 41701, has Bomber artifacts.

Notable alumni
 Max Macon (1950–1951)
 Johnny Podres (1951) 4-time MLB All-Star; 1957 NL ERA Title

References

External links
Baseball Reference
Top 100 Minor League Teams of all time #81: 1951 Hazard Bombers

Defunct minor league baseball teams
Brooklyn Dodgers minor league affiliates
Professional baseball teams in Kentucky
Defunct Mountain States League (1948–1954) teams
Baseball teams established in 1948
1948 establishments in Kentucky
1952 disestablishments in Kentucky
Baseball teams disestablished in 1952
Defunct baseball teams in Kentucky
Bombers